Golden Valley High School (abbr. GVHS) is a public American senior high school set in Bakersfield, California. The school is part of the Kern High School District. Its campus is located on the corner of Hosking Avenue and Monitor Street/Shannon Drive.

History
Golden Valley High School was founded in 2003 and opened on August 18, 2003. Tani G. Cantil-Sakauye, the 28th Chief Justice of California, visited Golden Valley High School on May 17, 2013 to present Golden Valley High School with the "Civic Learning Award of Excellence."

Academics
GVHS offers the following AP, and Honors courses, which students can take to earn college credit via the AP program, pass an SAT exam, or be academically challenged to prepare for college:

AP English Language and Composition
AP English Literature and Composition
Honors French
AP Spanish Language
Honors Chemistry
AP Biology
AP Spanish Literature
AP United States History
AP Physics
We the People (Honors Government)
AP Government
AP European History
Honors Anatomy and Physiology
Honors Spanish
AP Calculus AB
AP Statistics
Honors Math Analysis

Athletics
Below are all the sports that GVHS participates in and their respective season:
Fall
Cross Country
Football
Women's Golf
Women's Tennis
Women's Volleyball
Winter
Men's Basketball
Men's Soccer
Women's Basketball
Women's Soccer
Wrestling
Spring
Baseball
Men's Golf
Men's Tennis
Softball
Swimming
Track and Field

Clubs & Organizations
GVHS has the following clubs and organizations in which students can participate:

ASB (Associated Student Body)
AP Financial
AVID Club
Band
Black Student Union
Blue and Gold Club
Breast Friends Club
Cheerleading
Choir
Colorguard
Class Representatives (President, Vice-President, Secretary, and Treasurer for each class)
Cross Club
CSF (California Scholarship Federation)
Drama Club
Drum Line
FFA (Future Farmers of America)
French Club
Mock Trial 
Friendship Club
GSA (Gay Straight Alliance) 
Honors Society
Interact Club
Science Bowl 
Science and Medicine Club
Spanish Club
Winterguard
Yearbook
Words and Arts Club
Wood Construction Club
RN Club
L.I.S.T.O.S (Latinos In Stride To Obtain Success)

References

External links

2003 establishments in California
Educational institutions established in 2003
High schools in Bakersfield, California
Public high schools in California